Homogyna pygmaea is a moth of the family Sesiidae. It is known from south-western Arabia.

Sesiidae
Moths described in 1899